Mfaz’ Omnyama (1959–2001) was a South African performer of Maskandi music, guitar player, and lyricist.

He is known for his hit singles such as Khula Tshitshi Lami, Ngisebenzile Mama and Ngiyashisa Bhe.

Early life and music career

Mpatheni was born in rural Nongoma, KwaZulu-Natal. He was a left-handed self-taught master of the string and stage, and released many top-selling albums in his time.

Khumalo was discovered by former Ukhozi FM presenter and host Bodloza Nzimande while working in a mine in North West province which employed labourers from the Eastern Cape, specifically from Pondoland. 

He was a solo musician and later became the part of a music group called “Izingqungqulu Zomhlaba” consisting of Phuzekhemisi and Ihhashi Elimhlophe. Busi Mhlongo did several cover versions of his songs in his memory.

Death
Mpatheni Khumalo died at the age of 42 in 2001, at St. Benedict Hospital in KwaZulu-Natal after struggling from pancreatic cancer. He left eight children and his wife.

Discography

Studio albums
 Emazweni Baba (1995)
 Amagugu (1996)
 Khula Tshitshi Lami (1997)
 Ngiyashisa Bhe!! (1999)
 Ngisebenzile Mama (2000)
 Ngihlanze Ngedela (2001)

International Performances
 Germany
 United Kingdom
 United States 
 Hong Kong

References

External links
 

1959 births
2001 deaths
Maskanda musicians
South African styles of music
Zulu music